Vilmorin may refer to:

Vilmorin, French-based seed producer
Philippe André de Vilmorin (1776-1862)
Louis de Vilmorin (1816-1860)
Philippe de Vilmorin (1872-1917)
Louise de Vilmorin (1902-1969)
Arboretum Vilmorin